Eunan O'Neill (born Newry, County Down, 12 August 1982) is an Irish television presenter.

Early life
O'Neill grew up in Crossmaglen, Co Armagh. 
He graduated in Communication, Advertising and Marketing at the University of Ulster. He also studied International Business at Wesley College in Delaware, and holds a postgraduate degree in Broadcast Journalism from the University of Sheffield.

Broadcasting career
Since 2005 O'Neill has worked for the international Russian television network, Russia Today, and is one of the station's main news anchors.

Personal life
O'Neill was a member of the Amateur Irish Kickboxing Squad for five years.

References

1982 births
Living people
Wesley College (Delaware) alumni
Television presenters from Northern Ireland
People from Newry
People educated at Abbey Christian Brothers' Grammar School
RT (TV network) people
Irish expatriates in Russia